Sam Webster may refer to:

 Sam Webster (writer), writer and Thelemite
 Sam Webster (cyclist) (born 1991), New Zealand cyclist